Germany competed at the 2014 Winter Paralympics in Sochi, Russia, held between 7–16 March 2014.

Alpine skiing

Germany has entered seven athletes in alpine skiing. In the combined, the first run is the slalom, the second is the super-G.

Men

Women

Snowboarding

Para-snowboarding is making its debut at the Winter Paralympics and it will be placed under the Alpine skiing program during the 2014 Games.

Men

Biathlon 

Men

Women

Cross-country skiing

Men

Women

Relay

See also
Germany at the Paralympics
Germany at the 2014 Winter Olympics

References

Nations at the 2014 Winter Paralympics
2014
Winter Paralympics